Casalromano is a comune (municipality) in the Province of Mantua in the Italian region Lombardy, located about  southeast of Milan and about  west of Mantua.

The municipality of Casalromano contains the frazione (subdivision) Fontanella Grazioli.

Casalromano borders the following municipalities: Asola, Canneto sull'Oglio, Fiesse, Isola Dovarese, Volongo.

Demographic evolution

References

External links
 www.comune.casalromano.mn.it/

Cities and towns in Lombardy